The Spare Parts Puppet Theatre is located at 1–9 Short Street, Fremantle, Western Australia, in Pioneer Park, opposite the Fremantle railway station.

History
The building was constructed as a commercial building in 1921.  It is a two-storey limestone building with a corrugated iron roof, constructed in the Federation Free Classical style of architecture.  The building was used as the State Shipping Service Office. In 1975 it was vested in the City of Fremantle and in September 1978 it was officially opened as the Fremantle Art Gallery. In 1988 it was refurbished to specifically accommodate the Spare Parts Puppet Theatre.

Heritage value
The building is listed on the City of Fremantle's Municipal Heritage List.

Current use
Spare Parts Puppet Theatre was founded by Peter Wilson, Cathryn Robinson and Beverley Campbell-Jackson in 1981, as part of an artist-in-residency program initiated by the WA Institute of Technology (now Curtin University of Technology). The company's first project was a puppet adaptation of Christopher Marlowe's Doctor Faustus for the 1981 Festival of Perth. For the first seven years, the company was a touring company, but in 1998 it acquired the Fremantle Art Gallery as a permanent home. From 1997 through to 2001, the company was under the artistic direction of Noriko Nishimoto. In 2001 Philip Mitchell was appointed the company's new artistic director.

In April 2008 the Spare Parts Puppet Theatre hosted the 20th UNIMA (Union Internationals de la Marlonette) World Puppetry Festival and Congress.

In a 2022 collaboration with The Doge NFT, Spare Parts Puppet Theatre produced Australia's first NFT collection for a theatre company. They also built a Doge puppet, which now has its own TikTok.

The NFT collection was photographed by Louise Coghill.

References

Further reading

 
 

Landmarks in Perth, Western Australia
Buildings and structures completed in 1921
Tourist attractions in Perth, Western Australia
Theatres in Western Australia
Puppet theaters
Theatre companies in Australia
Pioneer Park, Fremantle
State Register of Heritage Places in the City of Fremantle
Puppetry in Australia